Gerald Leon Cannon (born 1958) is an American jazz double bassist and visual artist.

Early life
Born in Racine, Wisconsin, he attended The University of Wisconsin at La Crosse where he met jazz player Milt Hinton. Cannon also studied at the Wisconsin Conservatory of Music in Milwaukee.

Biography 
Cannon moved to New York City at age 28, and he started to play at the Blue Note Jazz Club with musicians Winard and Philip Harper and Justin Robinson. From there, he moved to gigs  with Art Blakey's Jazz Messengers, Dexter Gordon, Cedar Walton Trio with Billy Higgins, Jimmy Smith, Jimmy Scott, James Williams, Hamiett Bluiett, Ed Thigpen, Frank Foster, John Bunch, Eddie Harris, Stanley Turrentine and Bunky Green. When  trumpeter Roy Hargrove came to a club where Cannon was working, they met. For the next seven years, Cannon performed as a member of Hargrove's band at major jazz festivals all over the world, including the North Sea Jazz Festival, Cape Town Jazz Festival, Montreux Jazz Festival, Umbria Jazz Festival in Perugia, and the Montreal Jazz Festival. He also was a part of the award-winning Crisol tour where Cannon played with Cuban musicians like percussionist Jose Luis "Chanquito" Quintana, Miguel "Anga" Diaz, Horacio "El Negro" Hernandez, and Chucho Valdes and studied with bassist Orlando "Cachahito" Lopez and pianist Ruben Gonzalez.

Style
Cannon carries the knowledge passed on to him by bassists Ray Brown, Sam Jones, Ron Carter, and Buster Williams and continues the legacy by conducting master classes throughout the U.S. and Europe. He taught at the Oberlin Conservatory in 2014, the Wisconsin Conservatory of Music in Milwaukee, and the New School in New York and at Long Island University. He also gave a number of master classes at the University of Wisconsin in Whitewater and Eau Claire, at Emory University in Atlanta, Georgia and at the Conservatory of Amsterdam.  Cannon was also a faculty member of the Conservatory of Maastricht, Holland. Cannon is currently Jazz Bass Instructor at JUILLIARD School (New York), Associate Professor of Jazz Bass at OBERLIN College & Conservatory (Ohio),and on the Board of the Directors at the Wisconsin Conservatory of Music.

After leaving Hargrove, Cannon held the bass chair for drummer Elvin Jones until his passing in 2004. Since then, Cannon has worked with Wynton and Branford Marsalis, Pat Martino, Louis Hayes, The Cannonball Legacy, Ernestine Anderson, Carmen Lundy, Abbey Lincoln, Gary Bartz, Joe Lovano, Monty Alexander, Larry Willis, Eddie Henderson, Steve Turre, Eric Reed, the Dexter Gordon Legacy Ensemble, and many other combinations, as well as with his own quartet. He continues to conduct Master classes around the world and remains the Musical Director for the McCoy Tyner Trio.

Discography

As leader 
 2003: Gerald Cannon (Woodneck Records) - Gerald Cannon
 2017: Combinations (Woodneck Records) - Gerald Cannon

As sideman 
 1965: I'm going on The Gospel Expressions
 1995: Quick Pick Shingo Okudaira (King)
 1995: Kilifi Shingo Okudaira (King)
 1995: Fire Tim Armacost (Concord)
 1996: Maconde Shingo Okudaira (King)
 1998: Live at Smalls Tim Armacost (Double Time Records)
 1998: Big Mama's Biscuits Sherman Irby (Blue Note)
 1998: Invitation  Anthony Wonsey
 1998: Big Bertha  Anthony Wonsey
 1999: Straight Swinging vol.1 Willie Jones III (WJ3 Records)
 1999: Moment to Moment Roy Hargrove (Verve)
 1999: Triangular 2 Cannon/Ralph Peterson, Jr./David Kikoski (Sirocco)
 2001: Don't Knock the Swing Vol. 2 Willie Jones III (WJ3 Records)
 2002: Profile  Jeremy Pelt (Fresh Sounds)
 2004: Intuition Wayne Escoffery (Nagel Heyer Records)
 2004: Faith Sherman Irby (Black Warrior)
 2005: You Tell Me Rick Germanson 
 2005: Slim Goodie Derrick Gardner and the Prophets
 2006: Keep Searchin' Steve Turre (HighNote) 
 2006: Black Warrior Sherman Irby (Black Warrior)
 2008: What's Your Story Roberta Donnay 
 2009: Off the Cuff Rick Germanson
 2009: Echoes of Ethnicity Derrick Gardner and the Prophets
 2009: Open the Gates Anthony Wonsey (Criss Cross Jazz)
 2011: Compare to What Derrick Gardner and the Prophets
 2013: On the Waves Dmitry Mospan
 2015: Love Looks Good on You Russell Malone
 2015: Spiritman Steve Turre
 2016: Routes The Stryker/Slagle band expanded
 2016: Alto Manhattan Steve Slagle (Panorama Records)
 2016: FE Francisco Mela and the Crash Trio
 2017: Cerulean Canvas Sherman Irby & Momentum
 2017: All These Hands Michael Dease Posi-Tone Records
 2018: Duane Eubanks Quintet: Live at Smalls Duane Eubanks SmallsLIVE
 2019: Three Score Ralph Moore WJ3 Records
 2019: Turquoise Twice Rick Germanson WJ3 Records
 2020: Shuffle and Deal Eddie Henderson, Donald Harrison, Kenny Barron, Gerald Cannon, Mike Clark (SMOKE SESSIONS Records)
 2021: Fallen HeroesWillie Jones III,Willie Jones, Jeremy Pelt, Sherman Irby, George Cables, Gerald Cannon, Steve Davis, Justin Robinson, Isaiah Thompson, Renee Neufville, WJ3 Records

References

External links 
 

1958 births
Living people
American jazz double-bassists
Male double-bassists
African-American jazz musicians
Wisconsin Conservatory of Music alumni
21st-century double-bassists
21st-century American male musicians
American male jazz musicians
21st-century African-American musicians
20th-century African-American people